Blue Heaven (2008) is a stand-alone novel by author C.J. Box, known for his popular Joe Pickett crime novels. It was published by Minotaur Books, an imprint of St. Martin's Press, and won the Edgar Award for Best Novel in 2009.

References

2008 American novels
Edgar Award-winning works
American mystery novels
Minotaur Books books